Milgram is a surname derived from the Yiddish word for pomegranate (מילגרוים, Milgroim) and may refer to:

 Arthur Milgram (1912–1961), American mathematician
 R. James Milgram (born 1939), American mathematician, son of Arthur
 Stanley Milgram (1933–1984), Yale psychologist
 Milgram experiment, his most famous study
 Goldie Milgram (born 1955), American reconstructionist Rabbi and author
 Anne Milgram (born 1970), former Attorney General of New Jersey; head of the U.S. Drug Enforcement Administration since 2021 
 Maureen Milgram Forrest, the founder chair and current chair, Leicesterherday Trust, Leicester

See also 
 Milgram & Company Ltd., a Canadian logistics company
 Babuška–Lax–Milgram theorem, in mathematics
 Lax–Milgram theorem
 Lions–Lax–Milgram theorem, in mathematics
 Milligram, a unit of measurement
 Related surnames
 Milgrom

Yiddish-language surnames
Jewish surnames